The flag of the Chinese People's Liberation Army is the war flag of the People's Liberation Army; the layout of the flag has a golden star at the top left corner and two Chinese characters "" to the right of the star, placed on a red field. The characters "" (literally "eight one") are a reference to the events of August 1, 1927 (8th month, 1st day); when the PLA was created by the Chinese Communist Party at the start of their rebellion in Nanchang against the Kuomintang Government.

History 
Based on a decree issued from Mao Zedong, the main flag of the PLA was created on 15 June 1949.

Design 
For ceremonies, a PLA flag with golden fringe is placed on a pole with gold and red spiral stripes and topped with a golden finial and red tassel. The branches of the PLA, the Ground Forces, Navy, Air Force, Rocket Force and People's Armed Police, also have their own individual flags. In a 1992 order, the flags of the three branches were defined: the top  of the flags is the same as the PLA flag; the bottom  are occupied by the colors of the branches. The flag of the Ground Forces has a forest green bar at the bottom, the naval ensign has stripes of blue and white at the bottom, the Air Force uses a sky blue bar at the bottom, the Rocket Force uses a yellow bar at the bottom and the People's Armed Police uses three olive stripes at the bottom. The forest green represents the earth, the blue and white stripes represent the seas, the sky blue represents the air, the yellow represents the flare of missile launching and the three olive stripes represents the People's Armed Police responsible for the three main tasks and force composition of maintaining national political security and social stability, maritime rights protection and law enforcement, and defense operations.
.

Gallery

References 

People's Liberation Army
Flags of the People's Republic of China
Military flags